Panasonic Presents: Access 360° World Heritage is a television show produced by the National Geographic Channel that highlights UNESCO World Heritage sites. It broadcasts in 193 countries. Episodes have covered The Great Barrier Reef, ancient castles of Prague, Mount Fuji, and the Everglades, among others.

References

External links 

2010s American documentary television series
2012 American television series debuts
National Geographic (American TV channel) original programming